Robert Pyle Robinson (March 28, 1869 – March 4, 1939) was an American banker and politician from Wilmington, in New Castle County, Delaware. He was a member of the Republican Party who served as Governor of Delaware.

Early life and family
Robinson was born at "Robinhurst," now Alban Park, in Wilmington, Delaware, son of Robert L. and Frances Delaplaine Robinson. He married Margaret Fouraker in 1905 and they had three children, Mary Frances, Robert Jr. and Frances Robinson Parsons. They were members of the Hanover Presbyterian Church in Wilmington.

Professional and politics career
Robinson began his career with the Central National Bank, becoming the president of the bank in 1916. He first was exposed to politics when he worked as personal secretary to Delaware U.S. Representative L. Heisler Ball from 1902 until 1903. In 1914 he lost the close contest for Delaware's Insurance Commissioner by only 98 votes. Ten years later, in 1924, he was a compromise choice to be the Republican candidate for Governor of Delaware and was elected, defeating Joseph Bancroft, the Democratic Party candidate.

Governor of Delaware
During his tenure, the major issues facing state government were related to secondary education and highway construction. With the passage of the controversial School Codes of 1919 and 1921 Delaware was committed to an aggressive program of school construction. Pierre S. du Pont had agreed to get the process started and provided the massive financial support from his own funds. However, that could not continue forever and yet the General Assembly refused to levy additional taxes. The new income tax and corporate franchise tax were capable of producing the revenue needed, but it was suspected everyone was not filing as they should have been. To remedy the situation Robinson appointed du Pont himself to be the State Tax Commissioner. Du Pont quickly modernized the office, increased the revenue from the income tax and assured the continuation of the school building program.

Robinson was also a proponent of the organization of the State Board of Charities and he supported a modernized pension system for needy mothers. It was increasingly clear that reform was needed in what is now known as the social services and legislation was introduced to replace the county "almshouses" with a state welfare home. The bill failed to pass, but Florence M. Hanby, who was the first woman elected to the General Assembly, introduced the "Hope Farm Bill" into this session, and it provided funding for the Anti-Tuberculosis Hospital at Hope Farm. Robinson also appointed the first female state Secretary of State in the United States, Fannie Harrington.

Death and legacy
Following his term as governor, Robinson returned to the presidency of the Central National bank in Wilmington. He died at Wilmington and is buried there in the Wilmington and Brandywine Cemetery.

Although never a farmer, in 1922 he became Master (President) of the State Grange and served as Treasurer of the National Grange. The 3-F's were the way he described his favorite activities: family, farming, and fishing. He was known to disappear from his desk in favor of a local pond. "Competent and diligent, he displayed a certain boyishness and shyness all his life."

Almanac
Elections are held the first Tuesday after November 1. The governor takes office the third Tuesday of January and has a four-year term.

Notes

References

Images
Hall of Governors Portrait Gallery , Portrait courtesy of Historical and Cultural Affairs, Dover.

External links
Biographical Directory of the Governors of the United States 
Delaware’s Governors 

The Political Graveyard

Places with more information
Delaware Historical Society; website; 505 North Market Street, Wilmington, Delaware 19801; (302) 655-7161
University of Delaware; Library website; 181 South College Avenue, Newark, Delaware 19717; (302) 831-2965

1869 births
1939 deaths
American Presbyterians
Burials at Wilmington and Brandywine Cemetery
Businesspeople from Wilmington, Delaware
Republican Party governors of Delaware